The 1980 Montreal Alouettes finished the season in 2nd place in the Eastern Conference with an 8–8 record. They appeared in the East Final, where they lost 24–13 to the Hamilton Tiger-Cats, ending their three-year reign as the East Conference representative in the Grey Cup.

Offseason

Preseason

Regular season

Standings

Schedule

Postseason

Awards and honours

References

External links
Official Site

Montreal Alouettes seasons
1980 Canadian Football League season by team
1980 in Quebec
1980s in Montreal